The Hyundai Nexo is a hydrogen fuel cell powered crossover SUV that was revealed at the 2018 Consumer Electronics Show on January 8, 2018. Replacing the Hyundai Tucson FCEV, the Nexo is the flagship for Hyundai's "eco car" portfolio.

Overview 
The Hyundai Nexo Blue has an EPA rated range of 380 miles (611 km). The Nexo Limited has a driving range of 570 km versus 470 km for the Tucson FCEV. The vehicle features three fuel tanks with a total capacity of 156 liters and 6.3 kg, versus 140 liters and 5.6 kg for the previous model. 

Unlike the Tucson FCEV that used a heavily modified version of the Tucson's underpinnings, the Nexo uses a purpose-built platform from an FCEV standpoint. The benefits come in the form of a lighter construction, a more powerful drivetrain, and a higher driving range. The Nexo has a 163 PS, 400 Nm electric motor, versus 135 PS and 300 Nm for the Tucson FCEV. 

The Nexo was released in South Korea in March 2018. The Nexo fuel cell components came with a 10-year or 160,000km warranty. In October 2020, South Korean sales exceeded 10,000 vehicles with 727 sold in 2018, 4,194 sold in 2019 and 5,097 sold up to October 2020.

The first Nexo sold in the United States in December 2018. The Nexo had earlier been unveiled to the media in October 2018 to be available only in California by the end of 2018. The Nexo was released in the United Kingdom in March 2019. The Nexo was released in Australia in March 2021 on special order  for lease.

Assistance systems

The Nexo also gets Hyundai's new assistance systems like the blind spot view monitor, lane following assist, and highway driving assist. Using surround view monitors, the blind spot view monitor provides the driver with a clear view of both the sides and the back of the car to facilitate a safer lane-change maneuver. Hyundai claims that it is the first carmaker to incorporate such technology.

The lane follow assist, as the name suggests, helps the car maintain its lane autonomously by detecting lane markings or road edges and automatically giving mild steering inputs to be in the center of the lane.

The highway assistant monitors the driving environment using sensors and can automatically adjust the speed of the vehicle to maintain a safe drive. Hyundai has also incorporated a remote parking assistant in the Nexo, which can autonomously park and retrieve the vehicle.

Air purification
The Nexo is fitted with an advanced air purification system that removes 100% of the damaging PM2.5 fine particulate matter from polluted air using a three-step filtration process.

Fuel
The fuel is hydrogen gas stored in pressurized tanks. It reacts with atmospheric oxygen to yield electrical energy and water.

In a 2018 trial, researchers at CSIRO in Australia successfully refuelled a Nexo with hydrogen separated from ammonia using a membrane technology.

Safety
The Nexo was awarded 5 stars by Euro NCAP in 2018.

See also
List of fuel cell vehicles
Hyundai Tucson (ix35) FCEV
Hyundai Intrado (concept car)

References

External links

Nexo
Crossover sport utility vehicles
Euro NCAP large off-road
Cars introduced in 2018
Hydrogen cars
Fuel cell vehicles
2020s cars